The Belgium national football team officially represents Belgium in men's international football since their maiden match in 1904. The squad is under the global jurisdiction of FIFA and is governed in Europe by UEFA—both of which were co-founded by the Belgian team's supervising body, the Royal Belgian Football Association. Periods of regular Belgian representation at the highest international level, from 1920 to 1938, from 1982 to 2002 and again from 2014 onwards, have alternated with mostly unsuccessful qualification rounds. Most of Belgium's home matches are played at the King Baudouin Stadium in Brussels.

Belgium's national team have participated in three quadrennial major football competitions. It appeared in the end stages of fourteen FIFA World Cups and six UEFA European Championships, and featured at three Olympics football tournaments, including the Football at the 1920 Summer Olympics which they won. Other notable performances are victories over four reigning world champions—West Germany, Brazil, Argentina and France—between 1954 and 2002. Belgium has long-standing football rivalries with its Dutch and French counterparts, having played both teams nearly every year from 1905 to 1967. The squad has been known as the Red Devils since 1906; its fan club is named "1895".

During the national player career of forward Paul Van Himst, the most-praised Belgian footballer of the 20th century, Belgium finished in third place as hosts at UEFA Euro 1972. After that, they experienced two golden ages with many gifted players. In the first period, which lasted from the 1980s to the early 1990s, the team finished as runners-up at UEFA Euro 1980 and fourth in the 1986 FIFA World Cup. In the second, under guidance of Marc Wilmots and later Roberto Martínez in the 2010s, Belgium topped the FIFA World Rankings for the first time in November 2015 and finished third at the 2018 FIFA World Cup. To date, Belgium is the only national team in the world to top the FIFA ranking without having won a World Cup or a continental trophy (Spain had topped the ranking in late 2008 without winning the World Cup, but had won the European title in 1964 and 2008; while the Netherlands topped the ranking in August 2011 without a World Cup title, but won the European title in 1988).

History 

Belgium was one of the first mainland European countries to play association football. Its practice in Belgium began on 26 October 1863, after an Irish student walked into the Josephites College of Melle with a leather ball. Initially an elitist pastime, during the following decades association football supplanted rugby as Belgium's most popular football sport. On 1 September 1895, ten clubs for football, athletics, cricket and cycling founded the Belgian sports board Union Belge des Sociétés de Sports Athlétiques (UBSSA); a year later UBSSA organised the first annual league in Belgian football.

On 11 October 1900, Beerschot AC honorary president Jorge Díaz announced that Antwerp would host a series of challenge matches between Europe's best football teams. After some organisational problems, on 28 April 1901, Beerschot's pitch hosted its first tournament, in which a Belgian A-squad and a Dutch B-team contested the Coupe Vanden Abeele. Belgium won, and beat the Netherlands in all three follow-up matches; FIFA does not recognise these results because Belgium fielded some English players. On 1 May 1904, the Belgians played their first official match, against France at the Stade du Vivier d'Oie in Uccle; their draw left the Évence Coppée Trophy unclaimed. Twenty days later, the football boards of both countries were among the seven FIFA founders. At that time, the Belgian squad was chosen by a committee drawn from the country's six or seven major clubs. In 1906, the national team players received the nickname Red Devils because of their red jerseys, and four years later, Scottish ex-footballer William Maxwell replaced the UBSSA committee as their manager. From 1912, UBSSA governed football only and was renamed UBSFA. During the Great War, the national team only played unrecognised friendlies, with matches in and against France.

At the 1920 Summer Olympics, in their first official Olympics appearance, the Red Devils won the gold medal on home soil after a controversial final in which their Czechoslovak opponents left the pitch. In the three 1920s Summer Olympics, they achieved fair results (four wins in seven matches), and played their first intercontinental match, against Argentina. However, over the following decade, Belgium lost all of their matches at the first three FIFA World Cup final tournaments. According to historian Richard Henshaw, "[t]he growth of [football] in Scandinavia, Central Europe, and South America left Belgium far behind". Although World War II hindered international football events in the 1940s, the Belgian team remained active with unofficial matches against squads of other allied nations.

Belgium qualified for only one of eight major tournaments during the 1950s and the 1960s: the 1954 World Cup. The day before the tournament began, the RBFA was among the three UEFA founders. Dutch journalists considered the draw of the 1954 Belgian team in their opener against England to be the most surprising result of that match day, even more than Switzerland's victory over the Italian "football stars". However, Belgium were eliminated after a loss to Italy in the second (and last) group match. Two bright spots in these decades were wins against World Cup holders: West Germany in 1954, and Brazil in 1963. Between these, Belgium defeated Hungary's Golden Team in 1956. The combination of failure in competitive matches, and success in exhibition matches, gave the Belgians the mock title of "world champion of the friendlies".

The team's performance improved during the early 1970s, under manager Raymond Goethals. Fully dressed in white, as the White Devils, Belgium had their first victories at World and European Championships at the 1970 World Cup and Euro 1972. En route to that Euro appearance, their first, they eliminated reigning European champions Italy by winning the two-legged quarter-final on aggregate. At the end stage, they finished third by winning the consolation match against Hungary. In 1973, the denial of a match-winning goal in their last 1974 FIFA World Cup qualification match for UEFA Group 3 cost Belgium their appearance at the finals, causing Belgium to become the only nation ever to miss a World Cup final round despite not allowing a goal during the qualifiers. The next two attempts to reach a major finals were also fruitless.

Beginning with a second-place finish at Euro 1980, the 1980s and the early 1990s are generally considered as Belgium's first golden age. Coached by Guy Thys, they achieved their spot in the 1980 final with an unbeaten record in the group phase; in the final, they narrowly lost the title to West Germany with the score 1–2. Starting with the 1982 World Cup, and ending with the 2002 World Cup, the national team qualified for six consecutive World Cup end stages and mostly progressed to the second round. During this period, managers Guy Thys, Paul Van Himst and Robert Waseige each guided a Belgian selection past the first round. In addition to receiving individual FIFA recognitions, the team reached the semi-finals of the 1986 World Cup. After reaching the Euro 1980 final, they were unsuccessful at subsequent European Championships, with early exits from their appearances in 1984 and in 2000. During the late 1990s, they played three friendly tournaments in Morocco, Cyprus and Japan, sharing the 1999 Kirin Cup with Peru in the latter. The greatest talents of the Belgian team during this golden age were retired from international football by 2000. At the eve of the World Cup in 2002, Belgium defeated reigning world and European champions France. During that World Cup, Belgium defeated Russia and tied with co-host Japan and Tunisia to reach the round of 16.

After the 2002 World Cup, the team weakened with the loss of more veterans and coach Waseige. They missed out five successive major finals from UEFA Euro 2004 until UEFA Euro 2012, and went through an equal number of head coaches. A 2005 win over reigning European champions Greece meant nothing but a small comfort. In between, a promising new generation was maturing at the 2007 European U-21 Championship; Belgium's squad qualified for the following year's Summer Olympics in Beijing, where the Young Red Devils squad finished fourth. Seventeen of them appeared in the senior national team, albeit without making an immediate impact. Belgium finished in second (and last) place at the Kirin Cup in May 2009, and lost against the 125th FIFA-ranked Armenian team in September 2009. After Georges Leekens' second stint as national manager, his assistant Marc Wilmots became the caretaker in May 2012.

After two matches as interim coach, Wilmots agreed to replace Leekens as manager. Following his appointment, the team's results improved, such that some foreign media regarded it as another Belgian golden generation. The young Belgian squad qualified as unbeaten group winners for the 2014 World Cup finals, and earned Belgium's second-ever place in a World Cup quarter-finals with a four-match winning streak. Belgium qualified for UEFA Euro 2016 with a match to spare in October 2015, and took the top spot in the FIFA World Rankings for the first time in November 2015, to stay first for five months. In the following year, Belgium could not confirm their role as outsider at the European Championship with a quarter-final elimination by the 26th FIFA-ranked Welsh team. This prompted the RBFA to dismiss Wilmots. In the 2018 World Cup qualifying allocation, they were seeded first in their group, and made the final tournament under Spanish manager Roberto Martínez, becoming the first European team besides hosts Russia to do so. Belgium was eliminated in the semi-finals by eventual champions France, but won the third place play-off against England. On 16 November 2019, for the first time in its history the team topped the World Football Elo Ratings, after a 1–4 away win over Russia during the Euro 2020 qualifiers.

Despite the impressive form in the UEFA Euro 2020 qualifiers as well as being regarded as the biggest contender for the European trophy, the tournament became a complete disappointment for Belgium. Being drawn in Group B alongside Russia, Denmark and Finland, Belgium easily conquered the group with three wins. In the knockout phase, Belgium first faced reigning champions Portugal in the last sixteen and survived the scare with a thunder strike from Thorgan Hazard to give Belgium a 1–0 win. In the quarter-finals, Belgium once again faced old foe Italy, but Belgium failed to take revenge for their 2016 loss, once again suffering a 1–2 defeat, with the goal being scored by Romelu Lukaku, ending Belgium's campaign on a sad note.

At the 2022 World Cup in Qatar, Belgium were drawn into Group F alongside Croatia, Morocco and Canada. Despite starting their campaign well with a 1–0 victory over Canada, they then suffered a shock 2–0 defeat to Morocco, and following a 0–0 draw with Croatia in their final group game, Belgium were knocked out of the tournament at the group stages for the first time since 1998. Following their elimination from the tournament, Martínez announced that he would be standing down as head coach after six years in charge of the national team.

In February 2023, it was announced that Domenico Tedesco has been appointed as the new head coach of the Belgian national team, replacing Roberto Martinez. Tedesco's first match as the head coach will be the a UEFA Euro 2024 qualifying match against Sweden on the 24th of March. This is Tedesco's first national coaching job, having previously worked at a club level with Schalke 04, Spartak Moscow, and RB Leipzig. Tedesco is contracted until the end of the UEFA Euro 2024 competition.

Team image

Kits

In home matches, the team's outfield players traditionally wear the colours of the Belgian flag: black, yellow and red. Red dominates the strip and is often the sole jersey colour. The away colours are usually white, black or both; in 2014, the squad introduced a third, yellow kit. Their shirts are often trimmed with tricolores at the margins. Since 1981, the RBFA emblem has been the national team's badge; the previous badge was a yellow lion on a black shield, similar to the escutcheon of the national coat of arms. On 8 November 2019, the Royal Belgian Football Association revealed a new logo, which preserved the main elements of the previous one: the royal crown, the wreath and the Belgian tricolor.

For their first unofficial match in 1901, the Belgian team wore white jerseys with tricoloured bands on the upper arms. Around their third unofficial match in 1902, the choice was made for a "shirt with national colours ... [that would indicate,] with a stripe, the number of times every player has participated in an encounter". Since 1904, Belgium's classic all-red jersey design has been altered twice. In 1904–05, the squad briefly wore satin shirts with three horizontal bands in red, yellow and black; according to sports journalist Victor Boin, the shirts set "the ugliness record". During the 1970s, manager Raymond Goethals chose an all-white combination to improve the team's visibility during evening matches.

Six clothing manufacturers have supplied the official team strip. Adidas is the producer since 2014, and closed a sponsorship deal with the RBFA until 2026; it was also the supplier from 1974 to 1980, and from 1982 to 1991. Former kit manufacturers are Umbro (early 1970s), Admiral (1981–1982), Diadora (1992–1999), Nike (1999–2010) and Burrda (2010–2014).

Media coverage

The first live coverage of a Belgian sporting event occurred on 3 May 1931, when journalist Gust De Muynck commentated on the football match between Belgium and the Netherlands on radio. Later, football broadcasts were also televised. As 60 per cent of Belgians speak Dutch and 40 per cent French, commentaries for the national team matches are provided in both languages. The matches are not broadcast in German—Belgium's third official language. During Belgium's tournament appearances in the 1980s and the early 1990s, Rik De Saedeleer crowned himself the nation's most famous football commentator with his emotional and humorous reports.

Initially the matches were transmitted mainly on public television channels: the former BRTN (now VRT) in Dutch, and the RTBF in French. Since 1994, commercial channels such as vtm and its sister channel Kanaal 2, and VIER in Flanders, have purchased broadcasting rights. The Euro 2016 round-of-16 match against Hungary was the most-watched programme in Belgian television history, with an audience of over four million viewers out of 11.3 million Belgian citizens.

In April 2014, the VRT started transmitting a nine-piece, behind-the-scenes documentary about the national team filmed during the 2014 World Cup qualifiers, titled Iedereen Duivel (Everybody Devil). Cable broadband provider Telenet broadcast an eight-part documentary about individual players titled Rode Helden (Red Heroes).

Side activities 

Multiple events were organised for the fans during the squad's peak popularity in the 2010s. During the 2014 World Cup qualifiers, a string of interactive events called the Devil Challenges were organised. The premise was that small groups of international players would do a favour in return for each of the five comprehensive chores their supporters completed ("colour Belgium red", "gather 500,000 decibels", etc.), all of which were accomplished. In June 2013, the Belgian national team's first ever Fan Day attracted over 20,000 supporters; a second was held after the 2014 World Cup. On the days of Belgium's 2014 World Cup group matches, large dance events titled Dance with the Devils took place in three Belgian cities. This type of happening was repeated during Belgium's Euro 2016 group matches.

Occasionally, the Belgian team directly supported charity. Between 1914 and 1941 they played at least five unofficial matches of which the returns were for charitable purposes: two against France, and three against the Netherlands. In mid-1986, when the Belgian delegation reached the Mexico World Cup semi-finals, the squad started a project titled Casa Hogar, an idea of delegation leader Michel D'Hooghe. Casa Hogar is a home for street children in the Mexican industrial city of Toluca, to which the footballers donated part of their tournament bonuses. In August 2013, the national team supported four social projects through the charity fund Football+ Foundation, by playing an A-match with a plus sign on the shoulders of their jerseys and auctioning the shirts.

In the 21st century, several national team players acted up against discrimination. In 2002, the national squad held its first anti-racism campaign in which they posed with slogans. A home Euro 2012 qualifier was given the theme of respect for diversity in 2010; this UEFA-supported action was part of the European FARE Action Week. Ex-Red Devil Dimitri Mbuyu—the first black Belgium player (in 1987)—was engaged as godfather, and other foreign, current, and former footballers who played in the Belgian top division participated. In 2018, four national team players spoke up against homophobic violence, in a video clip made by organisation Kick It Out.

Nickname, logo and mascot
After a 1905 match, a Dutch reporter wrote that three Belgian footballers "work[ed] as devils". A year later Léopold FC manager Pierre Walckiers nicknamed the players Red Devils, inspired by their jersey colour, and the achievement of three successive victories in 1906. Because of their white home shirts in the 1970s, they were temporarily known as the White Devils. Since 2012, the team logo is a red trident (or three-pronged pitchfork), an item that is often associated with the devil. Apart from that, the national squad has also had four official anthropomorphous mascots. The first was a lion in team kit named Diabolix, a reference to the central symbol in the Belgian coat of arms that appeared on the team jerseys from 1905 to 1980. In accordance with their epithet, the next mascots were a red super-devil and two fan-made modern devils; the most recent one, since 2018, was named "Red".

Supporters

Fans of the Belgian national team display the country's tricolour national flag, usually with an emphasis on the red element. In 2012, local supporter clubs merged into one large Belgian federation named "1895" after the foundation year of the RBFA. One year later, 1895 had 24,000 members. The nationwide interest in the football squad has also been reflected by the occasional presence of Belgian monarchs at their matches since 1914. One of the greatest moments for the Belgian team and their 12th man was in mid-1986 when the Belgian delegation at the Mexico World Cup received a warm "welcome home". When the World Cup semi-finalists appeared on the balcony of Brussels Town Hall, the adjoining Grand Place square was filled with an ecstatic crowd that cheered as though their squad had won a major tournament.

The team's deterioration after the 2002 World Cup lead to their absence from the end stages of the next five major tournaments, and strained their popularity. Between 2004 and 2010, local journalists called the Belgian footballing nation "mortally ill". Of the fans that kept supporting their squad in bad times, Ludo Rollenberg was one of the most loyal. He attended the team's matches worldwide since 1990, missing only the 1999 Japanese Kirin Cup and two other matches by 2006, and was the only supporter to attend their matches in Armenia in 2009.

Just before the kick-off of a 2014 World Cup home qualifier, Belgium's footballers saw a first tifo banner, sized  depicting a devil in the national colours. The presence of many Belgian players in top leagues abroad, such as the Premier League, and promising results under Marc Wilmots, increased fans' enthusiasm and belief in a successful World Cup campaign. Because of this popularity peak, two Belgian monuments were decorated in national colours for the 2014 FIFA World Cup event; the Manneken Pis statue received a child-sized version of the new Belgian uniform, and facets of the Atomium's upper sphere were covered in black, yellow and red vinyl.

Rivalries

Belgium's main football rivals are its neighbors the Netherlands and France, with which it shares close cultural and political relations. The matchup between the Belgian and Dutch team is known as the Low Countries derby,  they have played each other in 126 official matches.  Belgium won the first four—unofficial—matches against the Netherlands, but lost their first FIFA-recognised contest. The two national teams played each other biannually between 1905 and 1964, except during the World Wars. They have met 18 times in major tournament campaigns, and have played at least 35 friendly cup matches: in Belgium for the Coupe Vanden Abeele, and in the Netherlands for the Rotterdamsch Nieuwsblad-Beker. The overall balance favours the Netherlands, with 55 wins against 41 Belgian victories. The Low Countries' squads co-operated in fundraising initiatives between 1925 and 1941; they played five unofficial matches for charity, FIFA and the Belgian Olympic Committee.

The clash between the Belgian and French sides is nicknamed le Match Sympathique in French ("the Friendly Match"); they have contested 74 official matches . The first match between Belgium and France, the Évence Coppée Trophy played in 1904, was the first official match for both teams and the first official football match between independent countries on the European continent. Until 1967, the sides met almost annually. As of September 2020, Belgium have the better record, with 30 wins to France's 25, and France has played most often against Belgium in international football.

Stadium

Numerous former and current venues in 11 urban areas have hosted Belgium's home matches. Most of these matches have been played in Brussels on the Heysel Plateau, on the site of the present-day King Baudouin Stadium—a multipurpose facility with a seating capacity of 50,122. Its field also hosts the team's final trainings before domestic matches. Since 2007, most physical preparation takes place at the National Football Centre in Tubize, or at Anderlecht's training ground in the Neerpede quarter. Apart from Belgian home friendlies, at the international level Belgium's national stadium has also hosted six European Championship matches.

In 1930, for the country's centennial, the venue was inaugurated as the Jubilee Stadium with an unofficial match between Belgium and the Netherlands. At that time, the stadium had a capacity of 75,000. In 1946, it was renamed Heysel Stadium after its city quarter. This new name became associated with the tragedy preceding the 1985 European Cup Final between Juventus and Liverpool; 39 spectators died after riots in the then antiquated building. Three years after the disaster, plans were unveiled for a renovation; in 1995, after two years of work, the modernised stadium was named after the late King Baudouin. In May 2013, the Brussels-Capital Region announced that the King Baudouin Stadium would be replaced by Eurostadium, elsewhere on the Heysel Plateau; in 2018, however, the plans for the new stadium were cancelled definitively.

Results and fixtures

, the complete official match record of the Belgian national team comprises 824 matches: 362 wins, 172 draws and 290 losses. During these matches, the team scored 1,475 times and conceded 1,297 goals. Belgium's highest winning margin is nine goals, which has been achieved on four occasions: against Zambia in 1994 (9–0), twice against San Marino in 2001 (10–1) and 2019 (9–0), and against Gibraltar in 2017 (9–0). Their longest winning streak is 12 wins, and their highest unbeaten record is 23 consecutive official matches.

The entire match record can be examined on the following articles:
 Results in chronological order lists all individual matches.
 Record per opponent shows the head-to-head record against other footballing nations.
 Statistics per manager compiles an overview per managerial period.

Upcoming fixtures are listed on the 2020s results page.

Results and fixtures
The following is a list of match results from the previous 12 months, as well as any future matches that have been scheduled.

2022

2023

Staff

Coaching history

Since 1904, the RBFA, 24 permanent managers and two caretaker managers have officially been in charge of the national team; this includes one national footballer selector. , a crew of over 20 RBFA employees guides the player group, including their Spanish manager Roberto Martínez, and goalkeeping coaches Erwin Lemmens and Iñaki Bergara. Under Marc Wilmots, Belgium reached the top FIFA ranking spot in 2015, which earned him the title of Best Coach of the Year at the 2015 Globe Soccer Awards. Under Guy Thys, the squad achieved record results at World and European championships; World Soccer magazine accordingly proclaimed him Manager of the Year in 1986.

Rather than developing innovative team formations or styles of play, Belgium's managers applied conventional tactics. At the three 1930s World Cups, the Red Devils were aligned in a contemporary 2–3–5 "pyramid". In 1954, Doug Livingstone's squad played in a 3–2–5 "WM" arrangement during World Cup matches. Throughout most of their tournament matches in the 1970s, the 1980s and the 1990s, the team played in a 4–4–2 formation. Since Raymond Goethals' stint in the 1970s, a key strength of the Belgian squad has been their systematic use of the offside trap, a defensive tactic that was already intensively applied in the 1960s by Anderlecht coach Pierre Sinibaldi. According to football journalist Wim De Bock, "master tactician" Goethals represented the "conservative, defensive football of the Belgian national team"; he added that in the 1970s, the contrast between the Belgian playing style and the Total Football of their Dutch rivals "could not be bigger".

In an attempt to win a match at the 1998 World Cup, Georges Leekens chose a 4–3–3 arrangement for Belgium's second and third group matches. Robert Waseige, Belgium coach around 2000, said that "above all, [his] 4–4–2 system [was] holy", in the sense that he left good attackers on the bench to keep his favourite formation. Wilmots opted for the 4–3–3 line-up again, with the intention of showing dominant football against any country.

Players

Current squad
The following 24 players were named in the squad for the UEFA Euro 2024 qualifying match against Sweden and the friendly against Germany on 24 and 28 March 2023 respectively.

Information correct , after the match against Croatia.

Recent call-ups
The following footballers were part of a national selection in the past twelve months, but are not part of the current squad.

 INJ

PRE Preliminary squad / standby

RET Retired from the national team INJ Player injuries

Notable

Between 1904 and 1980, mainly attacking Belgium players were recognised as talented footballers. In the team's first decade, striker Robert De Veen was very productive with 26 goals in 23 international appearances. Richard Henshaw described Alphonse Six as "Belgium's greatest player in the prewar period ... [who] was often called the most skillful forward outside Great Britain". The key player of the victorious 1920 Olympic squad was Robert Coppée, who scored a hat-trick against Spain's Ricardo Zamora, and the penalty in the final. Other outstanding Belgian strikers in the interwar period were former top scorer Bernard Voorhoof and "Belgium's football grandmaster" Raymond Braine, considered "one of the greatest players of the era".

Gifted players in the 1940s and the 1950s included centre-back Louis Carré and attackers Jef Mermans, Pol Anoul and Rik Coppens; at the 1954 World Cup, Anoul shone with three goals, and newspaper L'Équipe named Coppens the event's best centre forward. The 1960s and the early 1970s were the glory days of forward and four-time Belgian Golden Shoe Paul Van Himst, later elected Belgian UEFA Golden Player of 1954–2003 and Belgium's Player of the Century by IFFHS.  At the 1965 Ballon d'Or, Van Himst ranked fourth, achieving Belgium's highest ever position at the European football election. Decades after Coppens and Van Himst had retired from playing football, a journalist on a Flemish television show asked them "Who [from both of you] was the best, actually?". Coppens replied: "I will ask Paul that ... If Paul says it was me, then he's right". In 1966, striker Raoul Lambert and defending midfielder Wilfried Van Moer joined the national team; while the UEFA praised Lambert for his skills at Euro 1972, Van Moer won three Golden Shoes and equalled Van Himst's fourth rank at the 1980 Ballon d'Or.

Belgium has seen two talented waves since 1980, from which several players in defensive positions gained international fame. In the 1980s and the early 1990s, goalkeepers Jean-Marie Pfaff and Michel Preud'homme were elected best custodians at FIFA World Cups, while FIFA recognised midfielders Jan Ceulemans and Enzo Scifo as the propelling forces of Belgium's 1986 FIFA World Cup squad. In 2002, after all players of this generation had retired, Marc Wilmots became Belgium's top scorer at the World Cup with five goals.

During the 10 years from 2002 to 2012 in which Belgium failed to qualify for major tournaments, another golden generation matured, many of whom gained both prime individual and team awards in foreign European top clubs and competitions. These include defender Vincent Kompany, midfielder Kevin De Bruyne  who is one of the best attacking midfielders in the world and his generation; and winger Eden Hazard, who has been praised as one of Chelsea F.C.'s greatest players ever and one of his era's best footballers in the world, in the team, he is ranked only after Romelu Lukaku on Belgium's all-time scoring leaderboard. Honorable mentions of this golden generation are Thibaut Courtois, Jan Vertonghen, Dries Mertens, and Toby Alderweireld. These players helped Belgium finish at the third place of 2018 FIFA World Cup, the team's best result at the tournament and reach number one on FIFA ranking twice, since 2015.

Individual records

Most capped players

, the RBFA lists 707 players who appeared on the men's senior national team. With 145 caps according to the RBFA, Jan Vertonghen has the most appearances for Belgium. Eden Hazard started the most matches as captain (59). Hector Goetinck had the longest career as an international footballer: 17 years, 6 months and 10 days.

. The records are collected based on data from FIFA and RSSSF. Statistics include three matches that are unrecognised by FIFA.
Players in bold are still active with Belgium.

Top goalscorers

Romelu Lukaku is the highest-scoring Belgium player with 68 goals. Those who scored the most goals in one match are Robert De Veen, Bert De Cleyn and Josip Weber with 5; De Veen also holds the record for the most hat-tricks with three. Belgium's fastest goal after the initial kick-off was scored by Christian Benteke, 8.1 seconds into the match against Gibraltar on 10 October 2016.

 The records are collected based on data from FIFA and RSSSF. Statistics include three matches that are unrecognised by FIFA.
Players in bold are still active with Belgium.

Competitive record

FIFA World Cup

Belgium failed to progress past the first round of their earliest five World Cup participations. After two scoreless defeats at the inaugural World Cup in 1930, the team scored in their first-round knockout matches in the 1934 and 1938 editions—but only enough to save their honour. In 1954, they drew with England (4–4 after extra time), and in 1970, they won their first World Cup match, against El Salvador (3–0).

From 1982 until 2002, Belgium qualified for six successive World Cups, and in the tournament finals they advanced beyond the first round five times. In the 1982 FIFA World Cup opener, Belgium beat defending champions Argentina 1–0. Their tournament ended in the second group stage, after a Polish hat-trick by Zbigniew Boniek and a 0–1 loss against the Soviet Union.

At Mexico 1986, the Belgian team achieved their then best-ever World Cup run at the time. In the knockout phase as underdogs they beat the Soviets after extra time (3–4); the unnoticed offside position of Jan Ceulemans, during the initial ninety minutes, allowed him to equalise (2–2) and force the match into extra time. They also beat Spain, in a penalty shoot-out after a 1–1 draw, but lost to eventual champions Argentina in the semi-final 2–0, and France in the third-place match (4–2).

In the 1990 FIFA World Cup, Belgium dominated periods of their second-round match against England; Enzo Scifo and Jan Ceulemans hit the woodwork. David Platt's volley in the final minute of extra time, described as "nearly blind" by Richard Witzig, avoided an apparently goalless draw and led to the sudden elimination of the Belgians.

In 1994, a 3–2 defeat to defending champions Germany saw Belgium go out in the second round again. Afterwards, the entire Belgian delegation criticised referee Kurt Röthlisberger for not awarding a penalty for a foul on Belgian Josip Weber. Three draws in the group stage of the 1998 World Cup were insufficient for Belgium to reach the knockout stage. With two draws, the 2002 FIFA World Cup started poorly for Belgium, but they won the decisive group match against Russia 3–2. In the second round, they faced eventual World Cup winners Brazil; Belgium lost 2–0 after Marc Wilmots' headed opening goal was disallowed due to a "phantom foul" on Roque Júnior, as Witzig named it.

In 2014, Belgium beat all their group opponents with a single-goal difference. Thereafter, they played an entertaining round of 16 match against the United States, in which American goalkeeper Tim Howard made 15 saves. However, they defeated the United States 2–1 in extra time. In a balanced quarter-final, Argentina eliminated Belgium, after a 1–0 victory.

At the 2018 World Cup, Belgium started with five consecutive victories (including group wins over Panama, Tunisia and England). In the fourth, in the round of 16 match against Japan, they suffered a major setback in the second half by being led 0–2. However, Japan, which displayed a very open and offensive game, did not withdraw sufficiently in defense and left a lot of opportunities to Belgium who turned the tide and eventually won (3-2) with goals from Jan Vertonghen and late substitutes Marouane Fellaini and Nacer Chadli. Belgium then defeated World Cup favourites Brazil 2–1 on the back of an early Fernandinho own goal and a goal by Kevin De Bruyne, and reached the semifinals. Belgium lost to France 0–1 in the semi-final, as France displays a style of play opposite to that of Japan by basing themselves above all on a rigorous defense, the possession left to the adversary and fast counter-attacks (which aroused criticisms from certain Belgian players on the French style of play); but rebounded to win 2–0 in their second victory over England in the tournament to secure third place and the best ever World Cup result for the Belgian national team. Some players that notably contributed were captain Eden Hazard, Thibaut Courtois and Romelu Lukaku, who were later recognised by FIFA as the tournament's second best player (Silver Ball), best goalkeeper (Golden Glove) and third top scorer (Bronze Boot), respectively.

UEFA European Championship

With only six successful qualification campaigns out of sixteen, Belgium's performance in the European Championship does not compare to their World Cup record, yet it holds the highest record compare to their World Cup performance. Belgium has hosted or co-hosted the event twice; they were chosen to accommodate the UEFA Euro 1972 from three candidates, and hosted UEFA Euro 2000 with the Netherlands.

At Euro 1972, Belgium finished third after losing 1–2 against West Germany and beating Hungary 2–1. The team's best continental result is their second place at Euro 1980 in Italy. By finishing as group winners, Belgium reached the final, to face West Germany. The West German Horst Hrubesch scored first, but René Vandereycken equalised courtesy of a penalty. Two minutes before the regular playing time ended, Hrubesch scored again denying Belgium a first European title.

At Euro 1984, in their last and decisive group match against Denmark, the Belgian team took a 0–2 lead, but the Danes won the match 3–2. Sixteen years later, Belgium automatically reappeared at UEFA's national team tournament as co-hosts. After winning the Euro 2000 opener against Sweden 2–1, two 2–0 losses against eventual runners-up Italy and Turkey eliminated the Belgians from the tournament by the end of the group stage.

In spite of winning with broad margins against the Republic of Ireland (3–0) and Hungary (0–4) at Euro 2016, Belgium exited in the quarter-finals. As during the tournament's qualifiers, Wales defeated Belgium. This time by 3–1.

UEFA Nations League

*Draws include knockout matches decided on penalty kicks.

Football at the Summer Olympics

Football tournaments for senior men's national teams took place in six Summer Olympics between 1908 and 1936. The Belgian squad participated in all three Football at the Summer Olympics in the 1920s and kept the gold medal at home at the 1920 edition. Apart from the proper national team, two other Belgian delegations appeared at the Olympics. At the 1900 Summer Olympics, a Belgian representation with mainly students won bronze, and at the 2008 edition, Belgium's U-23 selection placed fourth.

Belgium's 1920 Olympics squad was given a bye into the quarter-finals, where they won 3–1 against Spain, and reached the semi-finals, where they beat the Netherlands 3–0. In the first half of the finals against Czechoslovakia, the Belgians led 2–0. Forward Robert Coppée converted a disputed early penalty, and the action in which attacker Henri Larnoe doubled the score was also a matter of debate. After the dismissal of the Czechoslovak left-back Karel Steiner, the discontented visitors left the pitch in the 40th minute. Afterwards, the away team reported their reasons for protest to the Olympics organisation; these complaints were dismissed and the Czechoslovaks were disqualified. The 2–0 score was allowed to stand and Belgium were crowned the champions.

FIFA ranking history

Source:

Belgium's history in the FIFA World Rankings. The table shows the position that Belgium held in December of each year (and the current position as of 2022), as well as the highest and lowest positions annually.

Honours

 FIFA World Cup
  Third place: 2018
 Fourth place: 1986
 UEFA European Championship
  Runners-up: 1980
  Third place: 1972
 Football at the Summer Olympics
  Gold medal: 1920
  Bronze medal: 1900

See also

 Belgium men's national football team results – unofficial matches
 Belgian Congo men's national football team (1948–60)
 Belgium men's national football B team
 Belgium men's national youth football team (U-15 – U-21 squads)
 Belgian First Division A
 Belgium women's national football team
 Sport in Belgium

Footnotes

References

Bibliography

  (Unpaginated version consulted online via Google Books; the particular phrase by Pelé can be retrieved with this search.)
  (Numberless page copy consulted online on 25 June 2014 on GOAAAL! Voetbalvaria (by RBFA))
  (Numberless book pages consulted online via Google Books)
 
 
  (Extract consulted online on 30 August 2010 on Beerschot Athletic Club)
 
 
 
 
 
 
 
 
 
  (Unpaginated version consulted online via Google Books; the particular fact is mentioned in chapter "The Only Time It Happened", section "10. Belgium".)

Further reading

External links

  
 FIFA team profile
 UEFA team profile
 ELO team records
 Belgian national team news website 
 Official supporters' federation 1895 

 
Football in Belgium
European national association football teams
1904 establishments in Belgium
Articles containing video clips
National sports teams established in 1904